Sarangesa is a genus of skippers in the family Hesperiidae. Most of the species in the genus are found in the Afrotropical realm, while a few are in the Indomalayan realm.

Species
Sarangesa astrigera Butler, 1893
Sarangesa aza Evans, 1951
Sarangesa bouvieri (Mabille, 1877)
Sarangesa brigida (Plötz, 1879)
Sarangesa dasahara Moore, [1866]
Sarangesa gaerdesi Evans, 1949
Sarangesa haplopa Swinhoe, 1907
Sarangesa laelius (Mabille, 1877)
Sarangesa lucidella (Mabille, 1891)
Sarangesa lunula Druce, 1910
Sarangesa maculata (Mabille, 1891)
Sarangesa majorella (Mabille, 1891)
Sarangesa maxima Neave, 1910
Sarangesa motozi (Wallengren, 1857)
Sarangesa motozioides Holland, 1892
Sarangesa pandaensis Joicey & Talbot, 1921
Sarangesa penningtoni Evans, 1951
Sarangesa phidyle (Walker, 1870)
Sarangesa princei Karsch, 1896
Sarangesa purendra Moore, 1882
Sarangesa ruona Evans, 1937
Sarangesa sati de Nicéville, 1891
Sarangesa seineri Strand, 1909
Sarangesa tertullianus (Fabricius, 1793)
Sarangesa thecla (Plötz, 1879)
Sarangesa tricerata (Mabille, 1891)

References

External links
Natural History Museum Lepidoptera genus database
 Seitz, A. Die Gross-Schmetterlinge der Erde 13: Die Afrikanischen Tagfalter. Plate XIII 76

Celaenorrhinini
Hesperiidae genera
Taxa named by Frederic Moore